Petrișor Voinea (born 28 May 1990) is a Romanian professional footballer who plays as a midfielder.

Club career

Italy
Petrișor began his football career in Italy having played with Livorno in their Primavera side, Petrișor was brought to professional football by Sangiustese who allowed him to debut in the 2009–2010 Serie C2 season.
He then went on to play for various other clubs in Italy. His last club in Italy was Manduria.

Vietnam

Vissai Ninh Bình FC
Petrișor has moved to Vissai Ninh Bình for the upcoming 2014 season in the Vietnamese V-League. He will also be partaking in the 2014 AFC Cup.

On 4 January 2014, Vissai Ninh Bình played in the Vietnam Super Cup against Hà Nội T&T. The game finished 2–2 in regular time but after penalties Vissai Ninh Bình proved they were the better team on the day and took home their first trophy of the season.

Voinea made his debut in the AFC Cup debut against South China at the Hong Kong Stadium. Playing a full 90minutes Voinea contributed to an important away win whilst collecting 3 points in the opening group match. He provided an assist for the opening goal and was instrumental in both his defensive and offensive roles. Voinea was rewarded for his performance by the 'Man of the Match' award.

In the second group match on 12 March 2014 against Yangon United Voinea again provided his worth to Vissai Ninh Bình as he scored and provided an assist in a 3–2 win to take his side to top of group G with 6 points in 2 matches.

Voinea scored his team's winning goal in an away win against Kelantan FA. The match finished 3–2 and Vissai Ninh Bình confirmed their place at the top of the group with a total of 9 points and 3 wins out of 3. So far Voinea has played 270 minutes in the 2014 AFC Cup.

In the 4th group match Voinea opened the scoring with a beautiful solo strike from outside the box. The final score against Kelantan FA at home in Vietnam was 4–0. This match gave Vissai Ninh Bình qualification to the round of 16 and only one more point is needed ensure they qualify as first in the group.

Sông Lam Nghệ An FC
After a match fixing scandal involving 10 of Voinea's teammates from Vissai Ninh Bình he was transferred to Sông Lam Nghệ An. For the remainder of the 2014 Eximbank V. League season he will wear the number 77 as his standard number 7 was already taken by another teammate.

Hong Kong

Sun Pegasus FC 
Voinea signed a contract with Hong Kong-based club Sun Pegasus. After a good first season at the club Voinea along with all his teammates were forced to look for new clubs after the club owner decided not to renew its licence for the 2015/16 season.

Romania

Petrolul Ploiești
After attracting interest from various clubs in the Romanian Liga I Voinea agreed terms with FC Petrolul Ploiești on a contract that can potentially keep him at the club for the next 3 seasons. He made his debut for the club against FC Steaua București on the first gameweek of the 2015/16 season.

Saudi Arabia

Wej SC
Voinea signed a contract with Wej SC and made a big impact in both the league and the cup.

Career statistics 

1Continental competitions are AFC Cup.

Honours

Club
Vissai Ninh Bình
Vietnam Super Cup (1): 2014

References

External links
The story of Petrișor Voinea career | oraexactainfotbal.ro 

1990 births
Living people
Romanian footballers
Romanian expatriate footballers
Song Lam Nghe An FC players
TSW Pegasus FC players
Wej SC players
FC Petrolul Ploiești players
Afif FC players
Hong Kong First Division League players
V.League 1 players
Liga I players
Saudi First Division League players
Saudi Second Division players
Romanian expatriate sportspeople in Hong Kong
Romanian expatriate sportspeople in Vietnam
Romanian expatriate sportspeople in Malaysia
Romanian expatriate sportspeople in Saudi Arabia
Expatriate footballers in Vietnam
Expatriate footballers in Hong Kong
Expatriate footballers in Malaysia
Expatriate footballers in Saudi Arabia
Association football forwards
Association football midfielders
A.C. Sangiustese players